Eero Erkki Emanuel Akaan-Penttilä (born April 17, 1943 in Heinola) is a Finnish politician and member of the parliament from the National Coalition Party. He was elected to Parliament of Finland in 1999.

References

External links
 Parliament of Finland: Eero Akaan-Penttilä 

1943 births
Living people
People from Heinola
National Coalition Party politicians
Members of the Parliament of Finland (1999–2003)
Members of the Parliament of Finland (2003–07)
Members of the Parliament of Finland (2007–11)